The women's kumite +60 kilograms competition at the 2002 Asian Games in Busan was held on 11 October at the Yangsan College Gymnasium.

Schedule
All times are Korea Standard Time (UTC+09:00)

Results

Main bracket

Repechage

References
2002 Asian Games Report, Page 485

External links
Official website

Women's kumite 61 kg